Iraqi Airways Flight 163 was a Boeing 737-270C, registered YI-AGJ, that was hijacked in 1986. On 25 December 1986, en route from Baghdad's Saddam International Airport to Amman, Jordan, Flight 163 was hijacked by four men. Iraqi Airways security personnel tried to stop the hijackers, but a hand grenade was detonated in the passenger cabin, forcing the crew to initiate an emergency descent. Another hand grenade exploded in the cockpit, causing the aircraft to crash near Arar, Saudi Arabia where it broke in two and caught fire.

There were 106 people on board, and 60 passengers and 3 crew members died. The pilots who survived, and the surviving passengers were able to tell authorities what transpired on the aircraft. The hijacking was one of the deadliest ever, and was one of many in 1985 and 1986.

Shortly after the hijacking, the pro-Iranian group Islamic Jihad Organization (a widely used name for Hezbollah) claimed responsibility. One of the dead hijackers was later identified by the Central Intelligence Agency as a Lebanese national named Ribal Khalil Jallul, whose passport photo was matched to a Hezbollah martyr poster found near a mosque in Beirut. Iraq accused Iran of being behind the attack.

See also

 Avianca Flight 203
 Aviation safety
 Cubana de Aviación Flight 455
 List of accidents and incidents involving commercial aircraft
 List of aircraft hijackings

References

External links 
 

Airliner accidents and incidents caused by hijacking
Aviation accidents and incidents in 1986
Terrorist incidents in Asia in 1986
Aviation accidents and incidents in Saudi Arabia
1986 in Saudi Arabia
Mass murder in 1986
Accidents and incidents involving the Boeing 737 Original
Iraqi Airways accidents and incidents
Iran–Iraq War
Hezbollah
Islamic terrorist incidents in the 1980s
1986 in Iraq
Airliner bombings
December 1986 events in Asia
Terrorist incidents in Saudi Arabia in the 1980s
1986 crimes in Saudi Arabia
Aircraft hijackings
1986 disasters in Iraq
1996 disasters in Saudi Arabia